Banksia ser. Grandes is a taxonomic series in the genus Banksia. It consists of two closely related species in section Banksia, both endemic to Western Australia. These are  B. grandis and B. solandri.

Species

References

External links

 ser. Grandes
Eudicots of Western Australia
Plant series